Olindo Koolman (born 15 April 1942) was the second governor of Aruba and served two terms of six years as governor from 29 January 1992 until 11 August 2004.

Biography
Koolman was born on 15 April 1942 in Aruba. He studied law, and in 1966 became a civil servant in the taxation office. Koolman was a member of the commission which prepared the status aparte of Aruba in which the island became a constituent country within the Kingdom of the Netherlands. On 29 January 1992, he became governor of Aruba and served until 11 August 2004.

References

Living people
1942 births
Aruban politicians
Governors of Aruba